Waldo Glacier is in the U.S. state of Oregon. The glacier is situated in the Cascade Range on the south-southeast slopes of Mount Jefferson. The glacier is named after John B. Waldo, as is Waldo Lake.

See also
 List of glaciers in the United States

References

Glaciers of Mount Jefferson
Glaciers of Jefferson County, Oregon
Glaciers of Oregon